The Khlout is a Moroccan Arabian tribe of Jacham, of the Banu Hilal confideracy.

History
Native to Bahrain today, the tribe first settled in Egypt and Tunisia. In the twelfth century, Almohade ruler Yakoub Al Mansour brought them in Morocco and installed them at Tamesna (current Chaouia).

The khlout inhabited the region of Tadla portion of Tamesna in the early days of the Saadi dynasty. Around 1540, they entered the service of Muhammad al-Sheikh and then they rebelled against him to join the Turkish army of Wattasid Abu Hassoun. After Muhammad al-Sheikh became the ruler of Morocco, the khlout took military controls in Morocco, introduced the payment of tax and deported their leader in Marrakech.
With the advent of Ahmed El Mansour in 1578, and due to their heroic conduct at the battle of El Oued Makhazen 1578, half of the tribe controlled the army; the other half was told to move to the Azghar.

See also
Beni Hassan
Maqil
Beni Ahsen
Azwafit
Rahamna

References

Arab tribes in Morocco
Demographics of Tunisia